The 48th Regiment Illinois Volunteer Infantry was an infantry regiment that served in the Union Army during the American Civil War.

Service
The 48th  Illinois Infantry was organized at Camp Butler, Illinois and mustered into Federal service in September, 1861.

The regiment was mustered out on August 15, 1865.

Total strength and casualties
The regiment suffered 10 officers and 113 enlisted men who were killed in action or mortally wounded and 6 officers and 251 enlisted men who died of disease, for a total of 380 fatalities.

Commanders
Colonel Isham N. Haynie - resigned on November 21, 1862.
Colonel William W. Sanford - resigned on January 18, 1864.
Colonel Lucien P. Greathouse - killed in action July 22, 1864.
Colonel Thomas L. Weens - mustered out with the regiment.

See also
List of Illinois Civil War Units
Illinois in the American Civil War

Notes

References
The Civil War Archive

Units and formations of the Union Army from Illinois
1861 establishments in Illinois
Military units and formations established in 1861
Military units and formations disestablished in 1865